Wikipedia has two articles on the Trial and execution of Charles I:
 High Court of Justice for the trial of Charles I
 Execution of Charles I